Mickey Simpson (December 3, 1913 – September 23, 1985) was an American supporting actor of burly roles, probably most familiar as "Sarge," the bigoted diner owner in the 1956 film, Giant. He appeared in over 175 films and television episodes.

Career
Born to Fred and Bertha Rogers Simpson, his paternal heritage was Irish. He was the eldest of four sons, one of whom, Richard, died in childhood. When his father, a contractor, was unable to work following the 1929 stock market crash, his mother supported the family as a waitress.

By his twenties, Simpson had grown into a hulking figure and considered a boxing career. He has been referred to in some sources as the 1935 "New York City Heavyweight Boxing Champion," but the only official records of his ring work are for two fights in Los Angeles in 1939, both of which he lost. Simpson, nicknamed "Mickey," arrived in Los Angeles in the late 1930s. Some unconfirmed stories have him working as a chauffeur for Claudette Colbert. In 1939, he reportedly played a tiny bit part in his first film, Stagecoach. The director, John Ford, would loom large in Simpson's career.

Simpson found fairly steady movie work as various guards, cops, bouncers, and thugs until his career was interrupted by World War II, in which he served in the United States Navy as a Shore Patrolman, keeping drunken sailors and townies from killing each other, while patrolling the many L.A. bars and strip clubs. When he returned to Hollywood, it was Ford who resurrected his career, giving Simpson a small but notable role as one of Walter Brennan's sons in My Darling Clementine. Simpson would appear in a total of nine Ford films. He appeared in 13 episodes of the TV series The Lone Ranger between 1950 and 1956, including episode 117 in 1953 and episode 141 in 1954. During the late 1950s he portrayed the role of Boley on the television series Captain David Grief. In 1957 Simpson appeared as Johnny Hines on the TV western Cheyenne in the episode titled "Decision at Gunsight." In 1960 he played bully cowboy Donovan in Bat Masterson.

Modern viewers may remember Simpson as Rocky Duggan in the Three Stooges film Gents in a Jam. Simpson played a memorable wrestler dubbed "the strongest man in the world." He even offered to tear a telephone book in half for the Stooges, who were hiding his unclothed wife (Dani Sue Nolan).

Later career and death
Simpson worked, primarily in lesser roles, until his late 50s. He died from heart failure in Northridge, California on September 23, 1985, at the age of 71. He was buried at Forest Lawn, Hollywood Hills Cemetery in Los Angeles.

Selected filmography

References

External links

1913 births
1985 deaths
Male actors from Rochester, New York
American people of Irish descent
American male film actors
American male television actors
People from Greater Los Angeles
Burials at Forest Lawn Memorial Park (Hollywood Hills)
20th-century American male actors
Western (genre) television actors